Charlotte Emily Gurr (born 16 August 1989) is an English footballer who plays as a midfielder for Hastings United Women. She is a former England under-19 international.

Club career
Gurr joined the Arsenal Ladies Academy at age 14 from Millwall Lionesses and played mainly for the reserves, though she made both her League and UEFA Women's Cup debuts in 2006. She moved to Chelsea Ladies, but returned to Millwall Lionesses in the summer of 2008. That was after playing for Bristol Academy at a tournament in Spain in May 2008. The following season she was part of the Millwall side that won the FA Women's Premier League Southern Division, and with it promotion back to the National Division.

Gurr signed for Hastings United Women in July 2022.

References

1989 births
Living people
English women's footballers
Arsenal W.F.C. players
Chelsea F.C. Women players
Millwall Lionesses L.F.C. players
FA Women's National League players
Women's association football midfielders
London City Lionesses players
Gillingham L.F.C. players